Thekkil  is a village in the Kasaragod taluk of Kasaragod district, Kerala, India. It is located a few kilometres east of Kasaragod, south of the Chandragiri River and west of the Kudumbur River, along National Highway 66.

Thekkil is also known for chandragiri river.

Demographics
As of 2011, Thekkil had a population of 14,299 people, of which 6,852 were male and 7,447 were female. 1,960 people, or about 13.7% of the population, were at or below the age of 6. The census reported 2,822 households in Thekkil.

References

Suburbs of Kasaragod